Plant Tycoon is a life simulation game about the breeding and growing of plants, published by independent developer Last Day of Work.

Plot 
Players take on the role of the owner of a plant nursery, who must breed and care for more than 500 different kinds of exotic plants, all the while attempting to keep the plant store economically viable long enough to achieve the ultimate objective: breeding the six Magic Plants.

Along the way, they can catch insects which are then added to a kind of "trophy" room, the duplicates of which can earn the player a significant amount of cash.

References

External links
 
 http://www.gamezebo.com/2007/09/10/plant-tycoon-review/
 http://www.insidemacgames.com/reviews/view.php?ID=887
 http://www.gamershell.com/pc/plant_tycoon/review.html

2007 video games
Life simulation games
MacOS games
Palm OS games
Video games about insects
Video games about plants
Video games developed in the United States
Windows games
Windows Mobile Professional games
Single-player video games
Last Day of Work games